Kalmia angustifolia is a flowering shrub in the family Ericaceae, commonly known as sheep laurel. It is distributed in eastern North America from Ontario and Quebec south to Virginia. It grows commonly in dry habitats in the boreal forest, and may become dominant over large areas after fire or logging. Like many plant species of infertile habitats it has evergreen leaves and mycorrhizal associations with fungi. It is also found in drier area of peat bogs.

Description
The attractive small, deep crimson-pink flowers are produced in early summer. Each has five sepals, with a corolla of five fused petals, and ten stamens fused to the corolla. They are pollinated by bumble bees and solitary bees. Each mature capsule contains about 180 seeds.

New shoots arise from dormant buds on buried rhizomes. This process is stimulated by fire. The narrow evergreen leaves, pale on the underside, have a tendency to emerge from the stem in groups of three. The Latin specific epithet angustifolia means "narrow-leaved". A peculiarity of the plant is that clusters of leaves usually terminate the woody stem, for the flowers grow in whorls or in clusters below the stem apex.

Cultivation

Kalmia angustifolia is cultivated as an ornamental garden shrub. It prefers a moist, acidic soil in partial shade. The species has gained the Royal Horticultural Society's Award of Garden Merit. Numerous cultivars have been selected for garden use, of which K. angustifolia f. rubra, with rich red flowers, has also won the award.

Toxicity
Kalmia contains a glycoside, known as andromedotoxin. It is poisonous to mammals. Hence, it can be unwelcome in pastures. Several of its folk-names testify to the plant's toxicity: 'lamb-kill', 'sheep kill', 'calf-kill', 'pig laurel', 'sheep-laurel' and 'sheep-poison'. It is also known as  narrow-leaved laurel and dwarf laurel.

References

angustifolia
Flora of the Northeastern United States
Flora of the Southeastern United States
Flora of the Great Lakes region (North America)
Flora of Eastern Canada
Flora of Saint Pierre and Miquelon
Flora of the Appalachian Mountains
Plants described in 1753
Taxa named by Carl Linnaeus
Flora without expected TNC conservation status